The following is a timeline of the history of the city of Riga, Latvia.

12th–14th centuries

 1158 CE – Area settled by Bremen merchants.
 1190 – Augustinian monastery established.
 1201 – Town built by Catholic bishop Albert.
 1202 
 Bishopric of Livonia relocates to Riga from Üxküll.
 Order of the Brethren of the Sword founded.
 1209 – St. Peter's Church active.
 1211 – Church of the Virgin construction begins.
 1225
  active (approximate date).
 St. James's Church dedicated.
 1234 – St. John's Chapel built (approximate date).
 1255 – Archbishopric of Riga established.
 1260 – St. Mary Magdalene's Church built.
 1282 – Riga joins Hanseatic League.
 1330 – Brotherhood of Blackheads organized.

16th century
 1510 – December: Christmas tree displayed in marketplace.
 1515 – Riga Castle rebuilt.
 1524 – Public library established.
 1541 – Riga joins League of Schmalkalden.
 1547 – Sigismund II of Poland in power.
 1558 – Riga area besieged by Russians.
 1561 – Territory converts to Lutheranism from Catholicism.
 1581 – Riga is granted status of Imperial Free City.
 1582 – Polish in power.
 1584 –  begin.
 1588 –  sets up printing business.
 1591 – St. Gertrude Church rebuilt.

17th century
 1621 – Riga taken by forces of Gustavus Adolphus of Sweden.
 1638 – Church of Jesus consecrated.
 1650 – Powder Tower rebuilt.
 1656 – Riga besieged by Russian forces of Alexis Mikhailovich.
 1698 – Swedish Gate constructed.

18th century
 1710 – Siege of Riga; Russians in power.
 1721 – Riga becomes part of Russian empire.
 1728 – St. Peter and St. Paul Church built (approximate date).
 1765 – City Hall built.
 1773 
 Great Cemetery and Pokrov Cemetery established.
 Himsel Museum established.
 1781 – City becomes capital of Riga viceroyalty.
 1782 – The Riga City Theater is founded.
 1785 – Our Lady of Sorrows Church built.
 1796 – City becomes capital of Livonia.
 1798 – Grebenstchikov House of Prayer rebuilt.

19th century
 1812
 Fire.
 Siege of Riga by French forces.
 1817 – Wohrmann Park inaugurated.
 1818 
 Annunciation of Our Most Holy Lady Church built.
 Erection of a granite column in a square facing the citadel to commemorate the defeat of Napoleon in 1812.
 1825 – St. Alexander Nevsky Church built.
 1833 – Homeopathic pharmacy opened by the Association of Chemists and Pharmaceutists.
 1845 – Museum of Natural History founded.
 1852 – St. Martin's Church built.
 1854 – Riga blockaded by British.
 1855 – Exchange built.
 1857 
 Large Guild built.
 Population: 70,463.
 1858 – City fortifications dismantled.
 1859 – English Church built.
 1861 – Riga Central Station built; Riga – Daugavpils Railway begins operating.
 1862 – Riga Polytechnical Institute founded.
 1863 – Riga City Theatre built.
 1866 – Small Guild built.
 1867 – Population: 102,590.
 1868 
 Riga – Jelgava Railway begins operating.
 Riga Latvian Society founded.
 1869 
 Polytechnic built.
 Riga City Art Gallery opens.
 Latvian Museum of National History founded.
 1870 – Kunstverein founded.
 1873 – Latvian Song and Dance Festival begins.
 1877 – Tornakalns – Tukums II Railway begins operating; Brasa Station opens.
 1878 – Imperial city self-government statute in effect.
 1881 – Population: 169,329.
 1883
 Riga Russian Theatre established.
 Nativity Cathedral built.
 1887 – St. Paul's Lutheran Church built.
 1889 – Riga – Lugazi Railway begins operating.
 1890 –  becomes mayor.
 1891 
 Church of Luther consecrated.
 Russian language becomes official language of Baltic provinces.
 1892 
 Municipal "counter-reform" enacted by imperial government.
 St. Francis Church consecrated.
 1895 – Holy Trinity Orthodox Church built; Holy Archangel Mikhail Church dedicated.
 1897 – Population: 282,943.

20th century

 1903 – Commercial school established.
 1905
 13 January: Demonstration suppressed by Russian army.
 Museum of Art built.
 1906
  (library) opens.
 St. Gertrude New Church built.
  established.
 1907 – Holy Trinity Cathedral built.
 1909 – Church of the Cross and Cat House built.
 1912 – Riga Zoo opens.
 1914
 Railway Bridge inaugurated.
 Population: 569,100.
 1915
 Brothers' Cemetery established.
 Port closed.
 1916 – Riflemen Museum founded.
 1917 – 3 September: Germans in power.
 1918 – 18 November: Riga becomes capital of independent Latvia.
 1919
 3 January: Soviets in power.
 May: Soviets ousted.
 National Library of Latvia, Latvia Higher School, Latvian Conservatory of Music, and Latvian National Theatre founded.
 Latvju Opera active.
 1920
 Riga Artists Group formed.
 Latvian Museum of Foreign Art established.
 Dailes Theatre opens.
 1921 – Art Academy established.
 1922 –  created.
 1927 – Mezaparks Lutheran Church active.
 1928 – Spilve Airport in operation.
 1930 – Riga Central Market built.
 1932 – The Ethnographic Open-Air Museum of Latvia opens.
 1935 – Freedom Monument unveiled.
 1937
 Mangali – Rujiena Railway begins operating.
 City hosts EuroBasket 1937.
 1940 – Soviet incorporation.
 1941
 13–14 June: June deportation .
 1 July: German occupation begins.
 October: Jewish ghetto created.
 Proletariat, Kirov, and Moscow administrative districts established.
 1944
 13 October: Soviets in power again.
  founded.
 1946 – Dinamo Riga ice hockey team formed.
 1949
March 25th-28th: March Deportations
Riga Autobus Factory is founded.
 1950 – Riga Medical Institute established.
 1954 – Latvijas Televīzija (television station) headquartered in city.
 1956 
 Academy of Sciences building constructed.
 Riga Aviation Museum established.
 1957
 Rīgas Balss newspaper begins publication.
 Stone Bridge opens.
 1958
 TTT Riga and BK VEF Rīga basketball clubs formed.
 Daugava Stadium opens.
 1964 – Coach Terminal built.
 1965 – Population: 657,000.
 1969 – October, Lenin, and Leningrad administrative districts established.
 1972 – Andrejs Upits' Memorial Museum founded.
 1973 – Riga International Airport built.
 1977 – Island Bridge built.
 1979 – Population: 840,000.
 1981 – Gorky Bridge opens.
 1984
 Alfreds Rubiks becomes mayor.
 Zolitūde construction begins.
 1985 
 Monument to the Liberators of Soviet Latvia and Riga from the German Fascist Invaders erected.
 Krisjanis Barons Memorial Museum established.
 Population: 883,000.
 1986 – Riga Radio and TV Tower built.
 1987
 14 June: Demonstrators commemorate 1941 deportations.
 Latvian Museum of Pharmacy founded.
 1988 – Riga Film Museum established.
 1989 
 Arsenals – Fine Arts Museum active
 Latvian Museum of Decorative Arts and Design opens.
 Riga Motor Museum founded.
 1990
 4 May: Restoration of Latvian independence
 Diena newspaper begins publication.
 Latvian Academy of Culture established.
 Andris Teikmanis becomes mayor.
 1991 
 January: The Barricades.
 6 September: USSR recognizes Latvian independence.
 St. Peter's Church rebuilt.
 Riga Marathon begins.
 1992
 Banking College founded.
 New Riga Theatre opens.
 Latvian Institute of International Affairs headquartered in city.
 1993
 8 September: Pope John Paul II visits Riga and celebrates mass at St. James's Cathedral and in Mežaparks.
 Museum of the Occupation of Latvia and Latvian Museum of Photography inaugurated.
 School of Business Administration Turiba founded.
 Rīgas Laiks magazine and Vakara Ziņas newspaper begin publication.
 1994 
 Maris Purgailis becomes mayor.
 Latvian Museum of Architecture and Latvian Railway History Museum established.
 Stockholm School of Economics in Riga campus established.
 1995 – Latvian National Opera house renovated.
 1996 – Skonto Arena opens.
 1997 – Andris Berzins becomes mayor.
 1998 – Riga Graduate School of Law established.
 1999 
 Riga Aviation University founded.
 City hosts 1999 European Athletics Junior Championships.
 House of the Blackheads rebuilt.
 2000
 Andris Argalis becomes mayor.
 BK Barons Kvartāls basketball club and Baltic Institute of Social Sciences established.
 Skonto Stadium opens.
 International Charter on Authenticity and Historical Reconstruction in Relationship to Cultural Heritage signed in Riga.

21st century

 2001
 Gundars Bojars becomes mayor.
 800th anniversary of founding of Riga.
 Riga Porcelain Museum and Kino Citadele open.
 Bikernieki Memorial unveiled.
 2002 – Providus Centre for Public Policy established.
 2003 
 Rigas Satiksme founded.
 City hosts Eurovision Song Contest 2003.
 Population: 739,232.
 2004
 1 May: Latvia joins the European Union.
  (hi-rise) built.
 2005 
 2 February: .
 12 March:  held.
 Aivars Aksenoks becomes mayor.
 Latvian National Museum of Art and JFK Olimps football club established.
 Riga Salsa Festival begins.
 2006
 Riga Planning Region and FK Jauniba Riga football club established.
 City hosts NATO summit.
 Arena Riga opens.
 City hosts 2006 IIHF World Championship.
 2007 – Janis Birks becomes mayor.
 2008 – Southern Bridge opens.
 2009 
 13 January: Riot.
 Nils Usakovs becomes mayor.
 Pushkin Statue erected.
 2010
 Body of European Regulators of Electronic Communications headquartered in Riga.
 Population: 703,260.
 2013
 20 June: Castle fire.
 21 November: Supermarket roof collapse.
 2014 – National Library of Latvia new building constructed.
 2015 – Zunda Towers built.
 2021 – Hostel fire.
 2022 – Monument to the Liberators of Soviet Latvia and Riga from the German Fascist Invaders demolished.

See also
 History of Riga
 Mayors of Riga

References

This article incorporates information from the Latvian Wikipedia, Polish Wikipedia, and Russian Wikipedia.

Bibliography

Published in 17th-19th centuries
  circa 1652/1680 
 
  
 
 
 
 
 
 
 
 
 
 

Published in 20th century
 
 
 
 
 
  
 Grava, Sigurd. "The Urban Heritage of the Soviet Regime The Case of Riga, Latvia." Journal of the American Planning Association 59.1 (1993): 9-30.
 
Published in 21st century

 Šolks, Guntis, Gita Dejus, and Krists Legzdiņš. "Transformation of Historic Industrial Areas in Riga." Book of Proceedings. (2012) online.

External links

 
 Map of Ryga region, ca.1700s
 Europeana. Items related to Riga, various dates.

 
Riga
Riga
Years in Latvia
Riga